Doodi is a 2022 Indian Tamil-language drama film directed by Karthik Madhusudhan and starring himself alongside Shritha Sivadas Sana Shalini. It's his debut direction and acting film which he wrote the story Screen play and dialogues. Music was composed by Balasarangan, Edited by Sam RDX. It was released on 16 September 2022. critics and audience gave the film 3-3.5 stars. Direction and acting was appreciated by the audience saying a bold attempt for a complicated story line which deals with emotions and desires which a girl and guy goes through in relationship.

Cast
Karthik Madhusudhan
Shritha Sivadas
Edwin Raj
Sana Shalini
Jeeva Ravi
Sriranjini
GV Madhusudhan
Uthara
Arjun Manikandan
Akshatha

Reception
The film was released on 16 September 2022 across Tamil Nadu. A critic from Maalai Malar gave the film a mixed review, and marking it 3 out of 5 stars. A reviewer from Dina Thanthi reviewed saying Karthik "boldly manages to say that love changes with age and maturity" which todays generation experiences in day today's life.

References

External links

2022 films
2020s Tamil-language films